Charles Kerr, 2nd Earl of Ancram (1624 – September 1690) was a Scottish peer and a member of the English House of Commons.

Biography
Charles was born on 6 August 1624 at Richmond, Surrey to Anne daughter of William Stanley, 6th Earl of Derby and the second wife of Robert Kerr, 1st Earl of Ancram. Until he inherited his father's title after the death of his father in December 1654 he was known by the courtesy title of Lord Carr.

Kerr had a long career in the English House of Commons. He was able to continue to sit in that house after he was ennobled, the fact that Earl of Ancram was a Scottish title was no impediment to sitting in the English House of Commons representing an English or Welsh constituency. Kerr was the Member of Parliament (MP) for St. Michaels in Cornwall between March 1647 and December 1648 in the Long Parliament, Robert Holborne, a Royalist, was disabled from sitting for St. Michaels and gave the seat to Kerr, who constituency's MP until he was excluded in Pride's Purge. Between July 1660 and December 1660 Kerr sat in the Convention Parliament representing Thirsk. After the Restoration In the Cavalier Parliament (from 1661 to 1681) he represented Wigan and again in the Oxford Parliament (from 1661 and 1681). The last Parliament in which he sat, still for Wigan, was the Loyal Parliament the first parliament of the reign of James II (from 1685 to 1687).

On his death, sometime between 1 September 1690 and 11 September 1690, the earldom devolved upon Robert Kerr, (afterwards Marquess of Lothian), the eldest son of Kerr's elder half brother William Kerr, 3rd Earl of Lothian.

Family
Ancram married Frances who was a Lady of the Bedchamber to Catherine, Queen Consort to King Charles II. They had daughter, Anne, who married Colonel Nathaniel Rich. Rich and Anne, his second wife, had no children.

Notes

References
Anderson, William (1867). The Scottish nation: or. The surnames, families, literature, honours, and biographical history of the people of Scotland, Volume 2, A. Fullarton, 1867
Lodge, Edmund (1847). The genealogy of the existing British peerage: with sketches of the family histories of the nobility, Saunders and Otley, 1847
Lodge, Edmund (1850).Portraits of illustrious personages of Great Britain: With biographical and historical memoirs of their lives and actions, Volume 5, H.G. Bohn, 1850

|-

Earls of Ancram
Members of the Parliament of England for Mitchell
1624 births
1690 deaths
English MPs 1640–1648
English MPs 1660
English MPs 1661–1679
English MPs 1679
English MPs 1680–1681
English MPs 1681
English MPs 1685–1687
People from Richmond, London